The Freewheelers were a rock and roll/roots rock quintet, consisting of Luther Russell on lead vocals and guitar, Jason Hiller on bass, Dave Sobel on Hammond Organ, Chris Joyner on piano, and John Hofer on drums. The band formed in 1989 in Los Angeles, California, and disbanded in 1996.

They released their debut album, The Freewheelers, produced by John Fischbach (Stevie Wonder, Carole King, Circle Jerks) on DGC Records in 1991. After they signed with new manager, David Reitman aka Tex, they soon signed with Rick Rubin's label, American Recordings, via producer George Drakoulias and released Waitin' For George in 1996.

Album discography
1991: The Freewheelers (DGC)
1993: The Freewheelers Play Bob Russell (Major, promo-only release)
1996: Waitin' For George (American)

Rock music groups from California
Musical groups established in 1989
Musical groups disestablished in 1996
Musical groups from Los Angeles
1989 establishments in California
1996 disestablishments in California